Are commonly refers to:
 Are (unit), a unit of area equal to 100 m2

Are, ARE or Åre may also refer to:

Places 
 Åre, a locality in Sweden
 Åre Municipality, a municipality in Sweden
Åre ski resort in Sweden
 Are Parish, a municipality in Pärnu County, Estonia
Are, Estonia, a small borough in Are Parish
 Are, Saare County, a village in Pöide Parish, Saare County, Estonia
 Arab Republic of Egypt
 United Arab Emirates (ISO 3166-1 alpha-3 country code ARE)

Science, technology, and mathematics 
 Are (moth), a genus of moth
 Activated reactive evaporation
 Admiralty Research Establishment, a precursor to the UK's Defence Research Agency
 Aircraft Reactor Experiment, a US military program in the 1950s
 Algebraic Riccati equation, in control theory
 Asymptotic relative efficiency, in statistics
 AU-rich element, in genetics

Organisations 
 Admiralty Research Establishment, a precursor to the UK's Defence Research Agency
 Association for Research and Enlightenment, an organization devoted to American claimed psychic Edgar Cayce
 Associate of the Royal Society of Painter-Printmakers, in the UK
 AIRES, a Colombian airline (ICAO code ARE)

Other uses 
are, a form of the English verb "to be"
 Are, note name, see Guidonian hand
 Are (surname), a surname recorded in Chinese history
 Dirk van Are, bishop and lord of Utrecht in the 13th century
 Are languages, a subgroup of the Are-Taupota languages
 Are language, a language from Papua New Guinea
 A.R.E. Weapons, a band from New York City, formed in 1999
 Architect Registration Examination, a professional licensure examination in the US

See also 
Ar (disambiguation)
ARR (disambiguation)
Arre (disambiguation)
R (disambiguation)